Neuromodulation is "the alteration of nerve activity through targeted delivery of a stimulus, such as electrical stimulation or chemical agents, to specific neurological sites in the body".  It is carried out to normalize – or modulate – nervous tissue function. Neuromodulation is an evolving therapy that can involve a range of electromagnetic stimuli such as a magnetic field (rTMS), an electric current, or a drug instilled directly in the subdural space (intrathecal drug delivery). Emerging applications involve targeted introduction of genes or gene regulators and light (optogenetics), and by 2014, these had been at minimum demonstrated in mammalian models, or first-in-human data had been acquired. The most clinical experience has been with electrical stimulation.

Neuromodulation, whether electrical or magnetic, employs the body's natural biological response by stimulating nerve cell activity that can influence populations of nerves by releasing transmitters, such as dopamine, or other chemical messengers such as the peptide Substance P, that can modulate the excitability and firing patterns of neural circuits. There may also be more direct electrophysiological effects on neural membranes as the mechanism of action of electrical interaction with neural elements. The end effect is a "normalization" of a neural network function from its perturbed state. Presumed mechanisms of action for neurostimulation include depolarizing blockade, stochastic normalization of neural firing, axonal blockade, reduction of neural firing keratosis, and suppression of neural network oscillations. Although the exact mechanisms of neurostimulation are not known, the empirical effectiveness has led to considerable application clinically.

Existing and emerging neuromodulation treatments also include application in medication-resistant epilepsy, chronic head pain conditions, and functional therapy ranging from bladder and bowel or respiratory control to improvement of sensory deficits, such as hearing (cochlear implants and auditory brainstem implants) and vision (retinal implants). Technical improvements include a trend toward minimally invasive (or noninvasive) systems; as well as smaller, more sophisticated devices that may have automated feedback control, and conditional compatibility with magnetic resonance imaging.

Neuromodulation therapy has been investigated for other chronic conditions, such as Alzheimer's disease, depression, chronic pain, and as an adjunctive treatment in recovery from stroke.

Invasive electrical neuromodulation methods

Electrical stimulation using implantable devices came into modern usage in the 1980s and its techniques and applications have continued to develop and expand. 
These are methods where an operation is required to position an electrode. The stimulator, with the battery, similar to a pacemaker, may also be implanted, or may remain outside the body.

In general, neuromodulation systems deliver electrical currents and typically consist of the following components: An epidural, subdural or parenchymal electrode placed via minimally invasive needle techniques (so-called percutaneous leads) or an open surgical exposure to the target (surgical "paddle" or "grid" electrodes), or stereotactic implants for the central nervous system, and an implanted pulse generator (IPG).  Depending on the distance from the electrode access point an extension cable may also be added into the system. The IPG can have either a non-rechargeable battery needing replacement every 2–5 years (depending on stimulation parameters) or a rechargeable battery that is replenished via an external inductive charging system.

Although most systems operate via delivery of a constant train of stimulation, there is now the advent of so-called "feed-forward" stimulation where the device's activation is contingent on a physiological event, such as an epileptic seizure. In this circumstance, the device is activated and delivers a desynchronizing pulse to the cortical area that is undergoing an epileptic seizure. This concept of feed-forward stimulation will likely become more prevalent as physiological markers of targeted diseases and neural disorders are discovered and verified. The on-demand stimulation may contribute to longer battery life, if sensing and signal-processing demands of the system are sufficiently power-efficient. New electrode designs could yield more efficient and precise stimulation, requiring less current and minimizing unwanted side-stimulation. In addition, to overcome the challenge of preventing lead migration in areas of the body that are subject to motion such as turning and bending, researchers are exploring developing small stimulation systems that are recharged wirelessly rather than through an electrical lead.

Spinal cord stimulation

Spinal cord stimulation is a form of invasive neuromodulation therapy in common use since the 1980s. Its principal use is as a reversible, non-pharmacological therapy for chronic pain management that delivers mild electrical pulses to the spinal cord. In patients who experience pain reduction of 50 percent or more during a temporary trial, a permanent implant may be offered in which, as with a cardiac pacemaker, an implantable pulse generator about the size of a stopwatch is placed under the skin on the trunk. It delivers mild impulses along slender electrical leads leading to small electrical contacts, about the size of a grain of rice, at the area of the spine to be stimulated.

Stimulation is typically in the 20–200 Hz range, though a novel class of stimulation parameters are now emerging that employ a 10 kHz stimulation train as well as 500 Hz "burst stimulation". Kilohertz stimulation trains have been applied to both the spinal cord proper as well as the dorsal root ganglion in humans. All forms of spinal cord stimulation have been shown to have varying degrees of efficacy to address a variety of pharmacoresistant neuropathic or mixed (neuropathic and noiciceptive) pain syndromes such as post-laminectomy syndrome, low back pain, complex regional pain syndrome, peripheral neuropathy, peripheral vascular disease and angina.

The general process for spinal cord stimulation involves a temporary trailing of appropriate patients with an external pulse generator attached to epidural electrodes located in the lower thoracic spinal cord. The electrodes are placed either via a minimally invasive needle technique (so-called percutaneous leads) or an open surgical exposure (surgical "paddle" electrodes).

Patient selection is key, and candidates should pass rigorous psychological screening as well as a medical workup to assure that their pain syndrome is truly medication-resistant. After recuperating from the implant procedure, the patient will return to have the system turned on and programmed. Depending on the system, the program may elicit a tingling sensation that covers most of the painful area, replacing some of the painful sensations with more of a gentle massaging sensation, although other more recent systems do not create a tingling sensation. The patient is sent home with a handheld remote controller to turn the system off or on or switch between pre-set stimulation parameters, and can follow up to adjust the parameters.

Deep brain stimulation

Another invasive neuromodulation treatment developed in the 1980s is deep brain stimulation, which may be used to help limit symptoms of movement disorder in Parkinson's disease, dystonia, or essential tremor. Deep brain stimulation was approved by the U.S. Food and Drug Administration in 1997 for essential tremor, in 2002 for Parkinson's disease, and received a humanitarian device exemption from the FDA in 2003 for motor symptoms of dystonia. It was approved in 2010 in Europe for the treatment of certain types of severe epilepsy. DBS also has shown promise, although still in research, for medically intractable psychiatric syndromes of depression, obsessive compulsive disorders, intractable rage, dementia, and morbid obesity. It has also shown promise for Tourette syndrome, torticollis, and tardive dyskinesia. DBS therapy, unlike spinal cord stimulation, has a variety of central nervous system targets, depending on the target pathology. For Parkinson's disease central nervous system targets include the subthalamic nucleus, globus pallidus interna, and the ventral intermidus nucleus of the thalamus. Dystonias are often treated by implants targeting globus pallidus interna, or less often, parts of the ventral thalamic group. The anterior thalamus is the target for epilepsy.

DBS research targets include, but are not limited to the following areas: Cg25 for depression, the anterior limb of the internal capsule for depression as well as obsessive compulsive disorder (OCD), centromedian/parafasicularis, centromedian thalamic nuclei and the subthalamic nucleus for OCD, anorexia and Tourette syndrome, the nucleus accumbens and ventral striatum have also been assayed for depression and pain.

Other invasive electrical methods

 Auditory brainstem implant, which provides a sense of sound to a person who cannot use a cochlear implant due to a damaged or missing cochlea or auditory nerve
 Functional electrical stimulation (FES)
 Vagus nerve stimulation (VNS)
 Hypoglossal nerve stimulation, an option for some patients who have obstructive sleep apnea
 Percutaneous tibial nerve stimulation (PTNS) for the treatment of incontinence.
 Peripheral nerve stimulation (PNS, which refers to simulation of nerves beyond the spine or brain, and may be considered to include occipital or sacral nerve stimulation) 
 Occipital nerve stimulation (ONS)
 Sacral nerve stimulation (SNS) / sacral neuromodulation (SNM)

Non-invasive electrical methods

These methods use external electrodes to apply a current to the body in order to change the functioning of the nervous system.

Methods include:
 Transcranial direct current stimulation (tDCS)
 Transcutaneous electrical nerve stimulation (TENS) and a prescription variant of TENS, transcutaneous afferent patterned stimulation (TAPS)
 Electroconvulsive therapy (ECT)

Non-invasive magnetic methods

Magnetic methods of neuromodulation are normally non-invasive: no surgery is required to allow a magnetic field to enter the body because the magnetic permeability of tissue is similar to that of air. In other words: magnetic fields penetrate the body very easily.

The two main techniques are highly related in that both use changes in magnetic field strength to induce electric fields and ionic currents in the body. There are however differences in approach and hardware. In rTMS the stimulation has a high amplitude (0.5–3 tesla), a low complexity and anatomical specificity is reached through a highly focal magnetic field. In tPEMF the stimulation has a low amplitude (0.01–500 millitesla), a high complexity and anatomical specificity is reached through the specific frequency content of the signal.

 Repetitive transcranial magnetic stimulation (rTMS)
 Transcranial pulsed electromagnetic fields (tPEMF)

Invasive chemical methods

Chemical neuromodulation is always invasive, because a drug is delivered in a highly specific location of the body. The non-invasive variant is traditional pharmacotherapy, e.g. swallowing a tablet.

 Intrathecal drug delivery systems (ITDS, which may deliver micro-doses of painkiller (for instance, ziconotide) or anti-spasm medicine (such as baclofen) directly to the site of action)

History

Electrical stimulation of the nervous system has a long and complex history. Earlier practitioners of deep brain stimulation in the latter half of the 20th century (Delgado, Heath, Hosbuchi. See Hariz et al. for historical review) were limited by the technology available. Heath, in the 1950s, stimulated subcortical areas and made detailed observations of behavioral changes. A new understanding of pain perception was ushered in in 1965, with the Gate Theory of Wall and Melzack. Although now considered oversimplified, the theory held that pain transmissions from small nerve fibers can be overridden, or the gate "closed", by competing transmissions along the wider touch nerve fibers. Building on that concept, in 1967, the first dorsal column stimulator for pain control was demonstrated by Dr. Norm Shealy at Western Reserve Medical School, using a design adapted by Tom Mortimer, a graduate student at Case Institute of Technology, from cardiac nerve stimulators by Medtronic, Inc., where he had a professional acquaintance who shared the circuit diagram. In 1973, Hosbuchi reported alleviating the denervation facial pain of anesthesia dolorosa through ongoing electrical stimulation of the somatosensory thalamus, marking the start of the age of deep brain stimulation.

Despite the limited clinical experience in these decades, that era is remarkable for the demonstration of the role technology has in neuromodulation, and there are some case reports of deep brain stimulation for a variety of problems; real or perceived. Delgado hinted at the power of neuromodulation with his implants in the bovine septal region and the ability of electrical stimulation to blunt or alter behavior. Further attempts at this "behavioral modification" in humans were difficult and seldom reliable, and contributed to the overall lack of progress in central nervous system neuromodulation from that era. Attempts at intractable pain syndromes were met with more success, but again hampered by the quality of technology. In particular, the so-called DBS "zero" electrode, (consisting of a contact loop on its end) had an unacceptable failure rate and revisions were fraught with more risk than benefit. Overall, attempts at using electrical stimulation for "behavioral modification" were difficult and seldom reliable, slowing development of DBS. Attempts at addressing intractable pain syndromes with DBS were met with more success, but again hampered by the quality of technology. A number of physicians who hoped to address hitherto intractable problems sought development of more specialized equipment; for instance, in the 1960s, Wall's colleague Bill Sweet recruited engineer Roger Avery to make an implantable peripheral nerve stimulator. Avery started the Avery Company, which made a number of implantable stimulators. Shortly before his retirement in 1983, he submitted data requested by the FDA, which had begun to regulate medical devices following a 1977 meeting on the topic, regarding DBS for chronic pain. Medtronic and Neuromed also made deep brain stimulators at the time, but reportedly felt a complex safety and efficacy clinical trial in patients who were difficult to evaluate would be too costly for the size of the potential patient base, so did not submit clinical data on DBS for chronic pain to the FDA, and that indication was de-approved.

However, near this time in France and elsewhere, DBS was investigated as a substitute for lesioning of brain nuclei to control motor symptoms of movement disorders such as Parkinson's disease, and by the mid-1990s, this reversible, non-destructive stimulation therapy had become the primary application of DBS in appropriate patients, to slow progression of movement impairment from the disease and reduce side effects from long-term, escalating medication use.

In parallel to the development of neuromodulation systems to address motor impairment, cochlear implants were the first neuromodulation system to reach a broad commercial stage to address a functional deficit; they provide sound perception in users who are hearing-impaired due to missing or damaged sensory cells (cilia) in the inner ear. The approach to electrical stimulation used in cochlear implants was soon modified by one manufacturer, Boston Scientific Corporation, for design of electrical leads to be used in spinal cord stimulation treatment of chronic pain conditions.

Relationship to electroceuticals

In 2012, the global pharmaceutical company GlaxoSmithKline announced an initiative in bioelectric medicine in which the autonomic nervous system's impact on the immune system and inflammatory disease might be treated through electrical stimulation rather than pharmaceutical agents. The company's first investment in 2013 involved a small startup company, SetPoint Medical, which was developing neurostimulators to address inflammatory autoimmune disorders such as rheumatoid arthritis.

Ultimately, the electroceuticals quest aims to find the electro-neural signature of disease and at a cellular level, in real time, play back the more normal electro-signature to help maintain the neural signature in the normal state. Unlike preceding neuromodulation therapy methods, the approach would not involve electrical leads stimulating large nerves or spinal cords or brain centers. It might involve methods that are emerging within the neuromodulation family of therapies, such as optogenetics or some new nanotechnology. Disease states and conditions that have been discussed as targets for future electroceutical therapy include diabetes, infertility, obesity, rheumatoid arthritis, and autoimmune disorders.

See also 
 Alim-Louis Benabid 
 Brain computer interfacing (BCI)
 BrainGate
 International Neuromodulation Society
 Interventional pain management
 North American Neuromodulation Society
 Neuromodulation (journal)
 Neuroprosthetics
 Neurotechnology
 Neurostimulation
 Optogenetics
 Visual prosthesis

References

Further reading 

 
 Althaus J: A Treatise on Medical Electricity, Theoretical and Practical; and Its Use in the Treatment of Paralysis, Neuralgia, and Other Diseases Philadelphia, Lindsay & Blakiston, 1860;163-170.
 
 
 
 
 
 
 
 
 
 
 
 
 
 
  
 
 
 
 
 
 
 
 
 
 
 Sharan AD, Rezai AR. Neurostimulation for Epilepsy. In: Krames ES, Peckham HP, Rezai AR, eds. Neuromodulation. London: Elsevier; 2009:617–66.
 
 
 
  
 
 .

External links 
 Neuromodulation: Technology at the Neural Interface
 Neuromodulation Appropriateness Consensus Committee (news release)

Implants (medicine)
Pain
Physical psychiatric treatments
Neurological disorders
Neurophysiology
Neuropsychology
Neurotechnology